Wallasey power station supplied electricity to the town of Wallasey and the surrounding area from 1897. It was owned and operated by Wallasey Corporation until the nationalisation of the British electricity supply industry in 1948.  The power station was redeveloped several times: including the incorporation of new plant in the 1920s and 1950. The station was decommissioned in the late 1960s.

History
In 1896 Wallasey Urban District Council were granted a license to supply electricity. The following year the council applied for a Provisional Order under the Electric Lighting Acts to generate and supply electricity to the town. This was granted by the Board of Trade and was confirmed by Parliament through the Electric Lighting Orders Confirmation (No. 6) Act 1897 (60 & 61 Vict. c. lxvi). The power station first supplied electricity on 1 February 1897.

In 1913 the Wallasey electricity committee noted that the demand for power was greater than the supply available. It proposed that a power station should be built in Limekiln Lane Poulton (53°24'29"N 3°02'45"W) at a cost of £60,000 to £65,000.

Equipment specification
The original plant at Wallasey comprised vertical compound engines coupled directly to Ferranti flywheel alternators. In 1898 the generating capacity was 150 kW, with 1,200 kW ready for installation, and 1,300 kW was on order.

Post-war plant
Following the First World War new plant was installed to meet growing demand for electricity. This included 5 MW installed in 1923, 5 MW in 1925 and 12.5 MW in 1928. In 1923 the generating plant comprised:

 Coal-fired boilers generating up to 109,000 lb/h (13.7 kg/s) of steam, this was supplied to:
 Generators
 1 × 1,000 kW steam turbo-alternator
 2 × 3,000 kW steam turbo-alternators
 1 × 5,000 kW steam turbo-alternator

These machines gave a total generating capacity of 12,000 kW of alternating current.

A variety of electricity supplies were available to consumers as:

 single phase, 50 Hz AC at 100 and 200 Volts
 3-phase, 50 Hz AC at 6,000 and 400 Volts
 500 V direct current (DC) for traction

Plant in 1955 
In 1950 a 12.5 MW Parsons turbo-alternator from Percival Lane power station was installed. At Wallasey power station. The plant in 1955 comprised:

 Boilers:
 3 × Babcock & Wilcox boilers with stoker firing, each 95,000 lb/h (11.96 kg/s), steam conditions 200 psi and 588°F (13.8 bar, 309°C),
 2 × Simon Carves boilers, pulverised fuel, each 110,000 lb/h (13.9 kg/s), steam conditions 300 psi and 650°F (20.7 bar, 343°C),
 1 × Yarrow oil fired boiler, 85,000 lb/h (10.7 kg/s), steam conditions 200 psi and 700°F (13.8 bar, 371°C), commissioned in October 1954.
 The boilers had a total evaporative capacity of 290,000 lb/h (36.5 kg/s), and supplied steam to:
 Turbo-alternators:
 2 × Brush-Ljungstrom 5 MW turbo-alternators, generating at 6.6 kV
 1 × English Electric Parsons 12.5 MW, turbo-alternator, generating at 6.6 kV.

The total installed generating capacity was 22.5 MW, with an output capacity of 21 MW.

Condenser cooling water was drawn from the adjacent dock.

Operations
In 1898 there were 6,040 (8-candle power) lamps connected to the system.

Operating data 1921–23
The operating data for the period 1921–23 is given in the table:

Under the terms of the Electricity (Supply) Act 1926 (16 & 17 Geo. 5 c. 51) the Central Electricity Board (CEB) was established in 1926. The CEB identified high efficiency ‘selected’ power stations that would supply electricity most effectively. The CEB also constructed the national grid (1927–33) to connect power stations within a region.

Operating data 1946
Wallasey power station operating data in 1946 is as follows:

The British electricity supply industry was nationalised in 1948 under the provisions of the Electricity Act 1947 (10 & 11 Geo. 6 c. 54). The Wallasey electricity undertaking was abolished, ownership of Wallasey power station was vested in the British Electricity Authority, and subsequently the Central Electricity Authority and the Central Electricity Generating Board (CEGB). At the same time the electricity distribution and sales responsibilities of the Wallasey electricity undertaking were transferred to the North Western Electricity Board (NORWEB).

Operating data 1954–67
Operating data for the period 1954–67 is shown in the table:

Closure
Wallasey power station was decommissioned in the late 1960s. The buildings were subsequently demolished and the area is derelict (in 2020).

See also
 Timeline of the UK electricity supply industry
 List of power stations in England
 Bromborough power station

References

Coal-fired power stations in England
Demolished power stations in the United Kingdom
Former power stations in England
Wallasey